Montenegro has recognised same-sex unions since 15 July 2021 in form of life partnerships. In July 2020, the Parliament of Montenegro passed a bill, by 42 votes to 5, to recognise life partnerships for same-sex couples offering several, but not all, of the rights and benefits of marriage. The bill was signed into law on 3 July 2020 by President Milo Đukanović, and took effect on 15 July 2021.

Background

The Constitution of Montenegro was ratified in 2007, one year after independence. Article 71 of the Constitution reads as follows: "Marriage may be entered into only on the basis of a free consent of a woman and a man. Marriage shall be based on equality of spouses." The wording has been interpreted as banning same-sex marriage.

Life partnerships
On 13 November 2012, Deputy Prime Minister Duško Marković said that the Government of Montenegro would prepare a bill giving some form of legal recognition to same-sex couples. The Human and Minority Rights Ministry drafted a bill to legalise registered partnerships, which would confer some of the rights, benefits and responsibilities of marriage but would not include adoption or fostering rights. The Serbian Orthodox Church and the Democratic Front expressed opposition to the proposal, claiming it would "wreck Christian values and family life in Montenegro". On 27 December 2018, the government gave its support to the draft bill. If enacted, it would have taken effect one year later. The bill was lodged in the Parliament on 24 January 2019, and on 27 February it was backed by the parliamentary committee on human rights. However, on 31 July 2019, the bill was blocked by parliamentarians, led by the Democratic Front, in a 38–4 vote with 39 abstentions. The necessary majority of 41 votes was not achieved. The Democratic Party of Socialists, the Social Democrats and the Liberal Party supported the measure.

On 12 December 2019, the government approved a second, similar draft. It was introduced to the Parliament on 14 January 2020. On 18 June 2020, the bill was backed by the parliamentary committee on human rights, and on 1 July 2020 it was approved by the Parliament in a 42–5 vote. The bill was supported by the Democratic Party of Socialists, the Social Democrats, the Social Democratic Party (except for one deputy), the Liberal Party and one deputy from DEMOS. It was opposed by the opposition (which abstained), as well as three parties representing ethnic minority communities (Croats, Bosniaks, and Albanians). The bill was signed into law on 3 July by President Milo Đukanović, and was published on 7 July 2020 in the Official Gazette of Montenegro. It entered into force on 15 July and became applicable on 15 July 2021. However, a deadlock in Parliament following Justice Minister Vladimir Leposavić's dismissal from office on 17 June 2021, as well as a lack of adequate documentation by local registrars, caused a delay for same-sex couples to register. The first partnership was conducted in the town of Budva between two women on 25 July 2021. Minister of Public Administration Tamara Srzentić congratulated the couple.

Prime Minister Duško Marković welcomed the law's passage, tweeting that it was "a great step in the right direction for Montenegrin society, its democratic maturity and integration processes. Equality and same rights for all are the cornerstone of human and European values. I want to thank the LGBTIQ community for dialogue and contribution. There can be no room for discrimination based on sexual orientation in a European Montenegro." The legislation establishes "life partnerships" for same-sex couples and guarantees many legal rights and obligations, including inheritance, guardianship, property, hospital and prison visits, protections from domestic violence, etc. While it does not recognize full adoption rights, the law allows a partner in a life partnership to make decisions concerning the other partner's biological children in emergency situations, and grants life partners the same rights as married couples with regard to disputes over the protection of their children's rights.

See also
LGBT rights in Montenegro
Recognition of same-sex unions in Europe

References

External links
 Same-Sex Life Partnership Act (Zakon o životnom partnerstvu lica istog pola). (in Montenegrin)

LGBT rights in Montenegro
Montenegro